David Andrew Smith (born 1982 in Katoomba, New South Wales, Australia) is an Australian chef, hospitality consultant, and producer of gourmet food products.

Career
Starting as a kitchen-hand at the age of 14, Smith spent years in the kitchens of small cafés, restaurants, and managing club catering operations. In August 2004, he was hired at Mash Café & Restaurant as the head chef in Glenbrook, New South Wales.

Mash Café & Restaurant served upmarket breakfasts and lunches, and contemporary fine dining for dinner. Within the first year of working for 'Mash', it received 'New Restaurant of the Year' from the NSW Restaurant & Catering associations VISA International Awards for Excellence. Soon afterwards followed a very positive review in the Sydney Eats Guide. The following year Mash received a review in the ''Sydney Morning Heralds Good Living Section and later in the year reviews in the Sydney Eats Guide and the influential Sydney Morning Herald Good Food Guide; the editor, Simon Thomsen, said in the review that "Mash gives new meaning to soul food". The following year also saw Mash getting reviews with the Sydney Eats Guide and the Sydney Morning Herald Good Food Guide.

In July 2008, Smith started at Glenella in Blackheath as the head chef. Glenella has operated as a guesthouse and restaurant since 1905. It was made famous between 1973 and 1989 by Michael and Monique Manners. The restaurant was considered by many as the pinnacle of regional dining.

David arrived at Glenella after the restaurant hadn't been operating for a number of years. The rooms and restaurant were renovated, and the famous restaurant was reborn. Their first review was in the Sydney Morning Herald'''s Traveler section saying "The piece de resistance of the modern-day Glenella, as with the original in the 1970s, is the quality of the food. The restaurant, under chef David Smith, who has made his way up the mountain from Mash Café and Restaurant at Glenbrook, has a small and simple menu comprising four entrees ($16), five mains including some outstanding rabbit and duck (all $32) and four desserts ($15), as well as a cheese platter. An application for a wine-bar license has been approved, so the non-diners will soon be able to enjoy a drink".

In September 2009, when the Sydney Morning Herald Good Food Guide was released, Glenella received a very positive review, setting them in line to grow on to better things. Unfortunately, even after these reviews and the business that they brought with them, the goal of the restaurant changed and in April 2010 Smith left Glenella.

Shortly after this, it was reported in the Sydney Morning Heralds Good Living section titled "A Surry state of affairs for Smith" that Smith was working on his new hospitality business, Oz Hospitality Consultants, and was looking at starting work as the executive chef for a new Italian restaurant in Surry Hills, Sydney.

At this stage, Smith focused on his consulting business, which offers Australia-wide hospitality consulting services, rather than returning to running a kitchen.

In December 2010, Smith, with his partner, Elizabeth Sgroi, opened their second business, Handsome Drake Fine Foods. Located in the Blue Mountains, New South Wales, they specialize in quality jams, relishes, chutneys, organic biscotti, organic lavish, flavoured oils, curry pastes, organic pasta, pasta sauces, preserved vegetables, and muesli.

Smith commented that he was looking into the opportunity to open a shop and café or a restaurant at some point within the next two years.

References

1982 births
Living people
Australian chefs